The Cross of the Order of Christ (Portuguese: Cruz da Ordem de Cristo), also known as the Cross of Christ (Cruz de Cristo) or the Portuguese Cross (Cruz Portuguesa), is a cross symbol of Portugal, originating in the Portuguese Order of Christ, founded in 1319. During the time of Prince Henry the Navigator, the cross came to be associated with the Portuguese discoveries and the Portuguese Empire. The cross can be considered a variant of the cross pattée or the cross potent.

History

As the Order of Christ, led by Prince Henry, the Navigator, was a leading developer of the Portuguese Discoveries, the Cross of Christ was used on the sails of the Portuguese caravels, carracks and other ships involved in the exploration of the seas. Because of this, the emblem was forever associated with the Portuguese discoveries, making it one of the main symbols of the discoveries and of the Portuguese Empire.

After, Manuel, duke of Beja and governor of the Order of Christ, having become King of Portugal, the Cross of Christ came to be regarded and used as a national emblem of Portugal. It has since become a generic Portuguese and, later, Brazilian emblem. After Pedro declared the independence of Brazil, and became Emperor of Brazil, the Cross of Christ was also present in the coat of arms and flag of the former Empire of Brazil.

Since 1789, the Cross of Christ is depicted on the Sash of the Three Orders.

It was also the symbol of the Movimento Nacional-Sindicalista, a Portuguese political movement of the early 1930s.

Usage

Today, the Cross of Christ is present in many flags and emblems of Portugal and Brazil. Examples are the flags of the city of São Paulo and the Portuguese Autonomous Region of Madeira, the coat of arms of several Portuguese and Brazilian cities and municipalities, the badges of the Portuguese and Brazil national football teams and the roundels of the Portuguese Air Force aircraft.

Gallery

Historical examples

Contemporary examples

See also
Portuguese heraldry
Coat of arms of Portugal
Armorial of Portuguese colonies
Portuguese vexillology
List of Portuguese flags
Brazilian heraldry

References

 Christ Knights’ Order (Portugal) Flags of the World

Cross symbols
Crosses in heraldry
Portuguese heraldry